Renganaden Seeneevassen State Secondary School is a state school based in Port Louis, Mauritius. The school is named after Renganaden Seeneevassen, the first Mauritian Minister of Education.

See also 
 Education in Mauritius
 List of secondary schools in Mauritius

References 

Schools in Mauritius
Port Louis
Girls' schools in Mauritius
1910s establishments in Mauritius
Educational institutions established in 1910